Dorland may refer to:

People
Philip Dorland (1755-1814), Canadian activist and jurist
 Thomas Dorland (1759-1832), Canadian soldier and politician
William Alexander Newman Dorland (1854-1956), American physician, soldier, writer, and editor of the American Illustrated Medical Dictionary among others
Corine Dorland (born 1973), Dutch cyclist

Fiction
 Agent Dorland, fictional character in the game Condemned 2: Bloodshot

Medicine
 Dorland, a.k.a. Dorland's Illustrated Medical Dictionary, core of Dorland's medical reference works